Patrice Gaille (born 15 April 1956) is a Swiss fencer. He competed at the 1976 and 1988 Summer Olympics.

References

1956 births
Living people
Swiss male fencers
Olympic fencers of Switzerland
Fencers at the 1976 Summer Olympics
Fencers at the 1988 Summer Olympics